The following highways are numbered 161:

Canada
  New Brunswick Route 161
  Prince Edward Island Route 161
  Quebec Route 161

Costa Rica
 National Route 161

India
  National Highway 161

Ireland
 R161 road (Ireland)

Japan
 Japan National Route 161

United Kingdom
  from Beckingham to Goole
 B161 road from A114 (Forest Gate) to A112 (near Leyton)

United States
 U.S. Highway 161 (former)
 Alabama State Route 161
 Arkansas Highway 161
 California State Route 161
 Connecticut Route 161
 Florida State Road 161
 Georgia State Route 161 (former)
 Illinois Route 161
 Indiana State Road 161
 Iowa Highway 161 (former)
 K-161 (Kansas highway)
 Kentucky Route 161
 Louisiana Highway 161
 Maine State Route 161
 Maryland Route 161
 Mississippi Highway 161
 Missouri Route 161
 Nevada State Route 161
 New Jersey Route 161
 New Mexico State Road 161
 New York State Route 161
 North Carolina Highway 161
 Ohio State Route 161
 Pennsylvania Route 161 (former)
 South Carolina Highway 161
 Tennessee State Route 161
 Texas State Highway 161
 Texas State Highway Spur 161
 Utah State Route 161
 Virginia State Route 161
 Washington State Route 161
 West Virginia Route 161
 Wisconsin Highway 161
 Wyoming Highway 161
Territories
 Puerto Rico Highway 161